dnata UK is one of the largest independent aircraft ground handling companies in England.

History
dnata UK was founded in 1987 as Plane Handling. By 1998, Gatwick Handling and Virgin Group each held a 50% shareholding. These were sold in October 1998 and August 2004 respectively to the Go-Ahead Group. In December 2009, the business was sold to dnata and rebranded.

Services
dnata UK specialises in ground and cargo handling at London Gatwick, London Heathrow (terminals 2, 3 and 4) and Manchester Airports. Its clients include Air India, Cathay Pacific, Emirates, Etihad, Singapore Airlines and Virgin Atlantic.

References

External links

Aircraft ground handling companies
Go-Ahead Group companies
The Emirates Group
Transport companies established in 1987
Virgin Group
1987 establishments in England
2009 mergers and acquisitions
British subsidiaries of foreign companies